Ramdas Bandu Athawale (born 25 December 1959) is an Indian politician and social activist from Maharashtra. He is the president of the Republican Party of India (A), a splinter group of the Republican Party of India and has its roots in the Scheduled Castes Federation led by Dr. B. R. Ambedkar. Currently, he is the Minister of State in the Ministry of Social Justice and Empowerment in Second Modi ministry and represents Maharashtra in Rajya Sabha, the upper house of India's Parliament. Previously he was Lok Sabha MP from Pandharpur.

Early life
Athawale was born on 25 December 1959 in Agalgaon, Sangli district, Bombay State, which is now Maharashtra. His parents were Bandu Bapu and Honsabai Bandu Athawale. He attended Siddharth College of Law, Mumbai and married to Seema Athawale, on 16 May 1992. He has a son. Ramdas Athawale is a practitioner of Buddhism.

Athawale has been editor of a weekly magazine called Bhumika and is a founder member of Parivartan Sahitya Mahamandal. He has served as president of Parivartan Kala Mahasangha, the Dr. Babasaheb Ambedkar Foundation and the Bauddha Kalawant Academy (Buddhist Artists Academy) and was founder president of Bauddha Dhamma Parishad (Buddhism conference). He played the title role in a Marathi film, Anyayacha Pratikar, and also had a small role in another Marathi film, Joshi ki Kamble, as well as roles in Marathi dramas such as Ekach Pyala.

Political career

Athwale was inspired by B. R. Ambedkar, the Indian polymath. Following a split in the Dalit Panther movement in 1974, Athawale joined Arun Kamble and Gangadhar Gade in leading a rump in Maharashtra. His involvement with a faction of the Republican Party of India, despite the Panther's general disdain for its leadership, eventually led to an association with the Indian National Congress (INC).

Athawale was member of Maharashtra Legislative Council from 1990 to 1996 and was Cabinet Minister for Social Welfare and Transport, Employment Guarantee Scheme and Prohibition Propaganda in the Government of Maharashtra between 1990–95.

He represented the Pandharpur constituency of Maharashtra and is the president of the Republican Party of India (Athawale) (RPIA).

Athawale represented Mumbai North Central in the 12th Lok Sabha during 1998-99 and was elected to serve a second term in the 13th Lok Sabha of 1999–2004. A third term, in the 14th Lok Sabha, followed from 2004–2009. Considered something of a lightweight in state politics, he has been courted at various times by various parties because of a perception that he might assist in mobilising the scattered Maharashtrian Dalit vote in their favour. He left the Nationalist Congress Party-INC alliance in 2011 after having lost in the 2009 Lok Sabha election, when he contested the reserved Shirdi constituency. This defeat was despite a subsequent report by Social Watch which ranked him as the second-best performing member of the 14th Lok Sabha, based on an analysis of various data points. Athawale led the RPI party, joined the alliance of Shivsena and the Bharatiya Janata Party (BJP) in 2011 and contested Brihanmumbai Municipal Corporation elections together.

In 2014, Athawale was elected to the Rajya Sabha, which is the upper house of parliament. He became Minister of State in the Ministry of Social Justice and Empowerment on 6 July 2016, working under Thawar Chand Gehlot.

His RPI(A) organisation is a part of the National Democratic Alliance led by the BJP.

Devyani Khobragade was proposed for the role of Personal Secretary to Athawale in July 2016 but the appointment was refused by Gehlot, who saw a conflict of interest because her father, Uttam Khobragade, was the national executive president of the RPI(A).

When Athawale established a children's wing of the RPI(A) in September 2017, he appointed his son, then aged 12, to be its leader.

In May 2019, Athawale continued his position as Minister of State for Social Justice and Empowerment.

In March 2020, a video of Athawale chanting ‘Go Corona!’ at a rally went viral and became a popular meme.

Social activism

In 2015, following attacks on Dalits in the state of Haryana, Athawale said that if the police were to continue turning a blind eye to their plight then special protection squads led by senior police officers should be formed from among members of the community and they should be granted firearms licenses so that they could protect themselves. In December 2017, he suggested that Dalits should renounce Hinduism in favour of Buddhism in order to stop being subject to "atrocities". He also criticised the record of the Hindu-centric BJP and Rashtriya Swayamsevak Sangh (RSS) in dealing with issues relating to discrimination of not only Dalits but also other disadvantaged communities in India. In March 2018, echoing remarks he had made soon after becoming Minister of State in 2016 and reacting in particular to recent atrocities against Dalits in Saharanpur, Unnao and Allahabad, Athawale advocated inter-caste marriage as the best way to minimise such events and noted that he had married a Brahmin "to set an example". As he had done in December 2017, he attacked Mayawati, a Dalit former Chief Minister of Uttar Pradesh, on this occasion for what he perceived as a lack of action to help Dalits during her four terms in office. He said that this had caused the community to shift their support to the BJP and RPI, while refuting charges that he was a puppet under BJP control.

Although described as a Dalit leader, Athawale has caused controversy among Dalits. In January 2018, around 130 people were arrested when some Dalit activists protested against him during a speech.

Aside from his involvement in Dalit affairs, Athawale has also advocated reservation for economically disadvantaged upper caste communities. He has said that the government of India should release the caste-based information collected during the 2011 Census of India, which is considered to be a politically sensitive dataset, in order to address inequities in the reservation system across the board. He rejects claims that doing so would lead to an increase in casteism.

Athawale has said that reservation quota of 25 percent for Dalits should be introduced to sports, including  cricket, following India's defeat in the 2017 ICC Champions Trophy Final against Pakistan, and that the armed forces should also be subject to a quota regime. He has also said that, just as the Lok Sabha has constituencies reserved for members of the Scheduled Castes and Scheduled Tribes, so too should the Rajya Sabha and the Union cabinet. In addition, he favours increasing the prevailing 50 per cent quota that exists for government jobs and places at educational institutions to 75 per cent, stressing that this would apply to all castes that are recognised as economically disadvantaged, which includes those categorised at Other Backwards Classes.

Positions held 

1990–96: Member, Maharashtra Legislative Council 
1990–95: Cabinet Minister, Social Welfare and Transport, Employment Guarantee Scheme and Prohibition Propaganda, Government of Maharashtra 
1998–99: Member, Twelfth Lok Sabha 
1998–99: Member, Committee on Transport and Tourism Member, Consultative Committee for the Ministry of Industry 
1999–2000: Member, Committee on Industry 
1999–2004: Member, Thirteenth Lok Sabha (second term) 
2002–2004: Member, Consultative Committee for the Ministry of Youth Affairs and Sports 
2004–2009: Member, Fourteenth Lok Sabha (third term) 
2004: Member, Committee on Transport, Tourism and Culture April 
2014: Elected to Rajya Sabha 
Aug. 2014-past: Member, Committee on the Welfare of Scheduled Castes and Scheduled Tribes Sept. 
2014-past: Member, Committee on Industry Nov. 
2014-past: Member, Library Committee Freedom Fighter
2016–past: Minister of State for Social Justice and Empowerment, Government of India
2020: Reelected to Rajya Sabha unopposed.

References

External links

Ramdas Athawale Facebook page

Living people
1959 births
Marathi politicians
People from Sangli district
India MPs 1998–1999
India MPs 1999–2004
India MPs 2004–2009
Lok Sabha members from Maharashtra
Rajya Sabha members from Maharashtra
Dalit politicians
Indian Buddhists
Republican Party of India (Athawale) politicians
Republican Party of India politicians
Narendra Modi ministry
Politicians from Mumbai
People from Solapur district
Members of the Maharashtra Legislative Council
20th-century Buddhists
21st-century Buddhists
Buddhist activists